During the 1992–93 English football season, West Ham United F.C. competed in the Football League First Division.

Season summary
Having missed the first season of the new FA Premier League following relegation in 1991–92, West Ham made a swift return to the top flight by gaining promotion to Division One as runners-up under manager Billy Bonds. Promotion was clinched on the last day of the season with a 2–0 home win against Cambridge United with goals from David Speedie and Clive Allen.

Changes to the West Ham side for this successful campaign included Clive Allen (signed near the end of the previous campaign) featuring as Trevor Morley's strike partner following the departure of Frank McAvennie (with the previous season's top scorer Mike Small making nine goalless appearances before leaving the club), and the midfield featured two new players; Peter Butler and Mark Robson.

Final league table

Results
West Ham United's score comes first

Legend

Football League First Division

FA Cup

League Cup

Anglo-Italian Cup

Squad

Notes

References

West Ham United F.C. seasons
West Ham United
West Ham United
West Ham United